The 1884–85 season was the 12th Scottish football season in which Dumbarton competed at a national level.

Scottish Cup

Dumbarton's run in the Scottish Cup was short-lived as they were knocked out in the third round by Pollokshields Athletic.

Dumbartonshire Cup

As the sport continued to grow, so did the demand for more competitive football, and so began the setting up of regional competitions for clubs in specific counties/cities.  The first was nine years earlier with the first playing of the East of Scotland Shield (formerly the Edinburgh FA Cup) and with the formation of the Dumbartonshire Football Association in March 1884, the first Dumbartonshire Cup was put up for competition. With three of the strongest teams in the country at the time playing out of Dumbartonshire, it was no easy feat to win the cup, and Dumbarton required to see off both of their strongest local rivals, Renton in the first round and Vale of Leven in the final, to become the first winners for the county cup.

Glasgow Charity Cup

Dumbarton reached the final of the Glasgow Charity Cup for the second time.  Three tough matches against Rangers were followed by a final against their old adversary Queen's Park, where they lost by the only goal.

Friendlies
During the season, 22 'friendly' matches were played, including a 0-0 draw against Queen's Park to celebrate the opening of the 'new' Hampden Park and 5 games against English opposition with mixed success.  In all, 9 were won, 7 drawn and 6 lost, scoring 50 goals and conceding 30.

Player statistics

Of note amongst those donning the club's colours for the first time was Ralph Aitken.

Only includes appearances and goals in competitive Scottish Cup matches.

Source:

International caps

An international trial match was played on 7 March 1885 to consider selection of teams to represent Scotland in the 1885 British Home Championship. Robert 'Plumber' Brown, Joe Lindsay, James McAulay and Michael Paton played for a 'Counties XI' against a 'Glasgow XI' with the latter winning 3-1, Brown scoring the 'Counties' goal.

Subsequently, five Dumbarton players were selected to play, as follows:

- Robert 'Plumber' Brown and Leitch Keir both earned their first caps against Wales.

- Joe Lindsay earned his sixth and seventh caps against England and Wales respectively.  He scored the only goal in the 1-1 draw against the English - and scored a hat-trick in the 8-1 defeat of Wales.

- James McAulay earned his fifth and sixth caps against England and Wales respectively.

- Michael Paton earned his third and fourth caps against England and Wales respectively.

Representative matches
The Dumbartonshire Football Association played three representative matches during the season and Dumbarton players were selected to play as follows:

Reserve team
Dumbarton withdrew from the Second Eleven Association in protest at the unsuccessful attempt to have the previous year's final against Kilmarnock Athletic replayed.

References

Dumbarton F.C. seasons
Scottish football clubs 1884–85 season